ZyLAB is a developer of software for e-discovery, information risk management, email management, records, contract, and document management, knowledge management, and workflow. The company is headquartered in McLean, Virginia, and in Amsterdam, Netherlands.

History 
In 1983 ZyLAB began providing a full-text search program for electronic files stored in IBM-compatible PCs called ZyINDEX. In 1991, ZyLAB integrated ZyINDEX with an optical character recognition program called ZyIMAGE. In 1998, the company developed support to full-text search email, including attachments.

In 2000, the company adopted the XML standard and created a full content management and records management system based on it.

In 2010, ZyLAB Information Management Platform was released, an integrated solution to address e-Discovery and information management problems.

References

External links
ZyLAB official website
Review of ZyImage 3.0 in InformationWeek
Review of ZyINDEX in The New York Times
ZyINDEX used in the Investigation of the Belated Production of Documents in the Oklahoma City Bombing Case

Companies established in 1983
Software companies of the United States
Information retrieval organizations